The Taste is an American cooking-themed reality competition series on ABC. It aired from January 22, 2013, through January 22, 2015. On May 7, 2015, ABC canceled The Taste after three seasons.

Format
The Taste season begins with blind auditions of both professional and amateur cooks during which four judges, who double as mentors, taste one spoonful of food from each contestant without knowing who cooked it or what all the ingredients were. Each judge decides whether or not they would like the contestant on his or her team by pressing a button (green for yes or red for no); the buttons are hidden from the other judges (although some decisions are revealed to the home audience). The four then meet the contestant and press a button to reveal their votes. If exactly one judge votes yes, that contestant automatically joins that judge's four-member team. If more than one judge votes yes, the contestant chooses among them.

Once the 16 contestants are chosen, each episode consists of team and individual challenges on a weekly theme.

In the team challenge, the contestants work for one hour with coaching from their mentors. Each mentor selects one dish to represent his or her team, which is tasted by a guest judge. The team with the best taste is rewarded with a private session with the guest judge, while the mentor of team who places last in the challenge must eliminate one of their contestants.

In the individual challenge, the contestants work without assistance for one hour. Each episode ends with the mentors tasting all the competitors' dishes without knowing what it is, how it was prepared, who created it, or whom they will be eliminating, awarding a gold star to the dish they liked the most and a red star to the dish they liked the least. The contestant or contestants with the worst bite of food is eliminated from the competition in the first two seasons.

Starting in the third season, the two contestants who receive the highest number of red stars in the individual challenge compete in a 40 minute, sudden-death taste-off. The mentors are not allowed to touch the contestants' food in this challenge. The competitor who has the best bite of food in the taste-off advances to the next stage of the competition, while the other competitor is eliminated.

Other aspects of the team and individual challenges vary by season. See season breakdowns for details.

Judges
The judges/mentors are Anthony Bourdain, Nigella Lawson, Ludo Lefebvre, and  Marcus Samuelsson. Brian Malarkey served on the panel for the first season. Bourdain and Lawson also serve as executive producers.

Michelin Guide chef David Kinch was a guest judge on episode 4 of season one, titled "Daring Pairings". Chef José Andrés was a guest judge on the season one finale, "The Taste Finale: Triple Threat".

Episodes

Season 1 (2013)

Format
In the team challenge, the creator of the best dish receives immunity from elimination for that episode.

In the individual challenge, the creators of the worst two (sometimes three) dishes are eliminated from the competition.

Finalists
Cooks are organized into four "Kitchen" groups, each with a mentor.

Contestant progress
Team
 Anthony's Kitchen      Nigella's Kitchen     Ludo's Kitchen      Malarkey's Kitchen 

 The cook won The Taste.
 The cook was one of the favorites.
 The cook was one of the least favorites, but was not eliminated.
 The cook was eliminated.

Episodes

Season 2 (2014)

Format
In the team challenge, the mentor of the team which created the worst dish must eliminate a member of his team.

In the individual challenge, the contestant who created the worst dish is eliminated.

Finalists
Cooks are organized into four "Kitchen" groups, each with a mentor.

Contestant progress
Team
 Anthony's Kitchen      Nigella's Kitchen     Ludo's Kitchen      Marcus' Kitchen 

 The cook won The Taste.
 The cook quit the competition.
 The cook was eliminated in the individual challenge.
 The cook was eliminated in the team challenge.
 The cook received the indicated number of gold stars.
 The cook received the indicated number of red stars.

 Because Jacquelyn quit during the judging of the team challenge, Marcus was not required to eliminate a member of his team even though his team lost the challenge.

Episodes

Season 3 (2014–15)
Season 3 of The Taste premiered on December 4, 2014 with Ludo, Nigella, Marcus, and Anthony as the judges. The first episode received 3.33 million viewers.

Contestants 

Renee Maynard was a contestant on season 18 of The Bachelor, and Joe Arvin was a contestant on season 14 of Big Brother.

Contestant progress 

Team
 Anthony's Kitchen      Nigella's Kitchen     Ludo's Kitchen      Marcus' Kitchen 

 The contestant won the taste-off and was saved from elimination.
 The contestant lost the taste-off and was eliminated.
 The contestant was eliminated in the team challenge.

Episodes

International versions
The international rights are distributed by Red Arrow International.

Other versions of this program has been aired in Canada (CTV Television Network), Australia (Nine Network) and Indonesia (IBC).

References

External links
 
 

2010s American reality television series
2013 American television series debuts
2015 American television series endings
American Broadcasting Company original programming
English-language television shows